Holý (Czech feminine: Holá) is a surname of Czech origin. Notable persons with that surname include:
 Antonín Holý (1936–2012), Czech scientist and chemist
 Jindra Holá (born 1960), Czech ice dancer
 Jiří Holý (1922–2009), Czech actor
 Karel Holý (born 1956), Czech ice hockey player
 Ladislav Holý (1933–1997), Czech anthropologist and Africanist
 Mirela Holy (born 1971), Croatian politician
 Stanislav Holý (1943–1998), Czech graphic artist
 Prokop the Great (c. 1380–1434), Prokop Holý, Hussite general
 Tomáš Holý (born 1991), Czech footballer

See also
 

Czech-language surnames